Pramod Mittal (born 1 September 1956) is an Indian businessman who was the chairman of Ispat Industries Limited (now JSW Ispat Steel).

Life and Career 
He was married to Sangeeta Mittal. The Couple has three children; Vartika, Shrishti and Divyesh. His younger brother is Lakshmi Mittal who is also a Businessman. He spent $82 million on his daughter's wedding in Barcelona.

In March 2019, the Supreme Court in India dropped charges against him after he paid money owed to a public sector enterprise.

Lakshmi Mittal, the Indian steel magnate, chairman and CEO of ArcelorMittal, has taken the baton of Indian brotherhood forward by paying off his brother's debt.

He is owner of Global Steel Philippines in Iligan which he acquired in 2004. Then President Gloria Macapagal Arroyo witnessed his acquisition of the Mill which was formerly known as the National Steel Corporation or NSC-which for many years was known as Asia's first and largest. President Arroyo's maternal roots are also from Iligan. In 2019, the cantonal court in Tuzla had ordered Mittal to also deposit nearly €11 million for alleged damages to GIKIL. He was declared bankrupt on 19 June 2020 in a London court.  

In October 2021, Pramod Mittal was named in the Pandora Papers. In 2023 he was charged with “heading an organised crime group” that allegedly helped him syphon around €11 million (USD 12 million) from Global Ispat Koksna Industrija Lukavac (GIKIL). He co-owned the plant near Tuzla in northeastern Bosnia with the local government. Various other charges include illegally taking control of the metallurgical coke producer despite failing to invest €23 million, or more than half the amount he committed to invest in 2003 in return for the 51 per cent stake in the company.

References

1956 births
Businesspeople from Rajasthan
Living people
Pramod
People named in the Pandora Papers